Calum Malcolm is a Scottish record producer, sound engineer and keyboardist, who is based in Edinburgh, Scotland.

He started his career in rock music with the band The Headboys in 1977.

From 1974, he has worked with bands and musicians such as The Blue Nile, Capercaillie, Clannad, Emily Barker, Fish, The Go-Betweens, Hue and Cry, Maire Brennan, Nazareth, Orange Juice, Aztec Camera, The Fire Engines, Mark Knopfler, Prefab Sprout, Runrig, Steve Adey, Kris Drever, The Silencers, Simple Minds and Wet Wet Wet; whilst Barb Jungr, Claire Martin, the Scottish Chamber Orchestra, Royal Scottish National Orchestra and Carol Kidd are others whom Malcolm has worked alongside in the recording studio.

His working credits also include The Boys of the Lough, Brian McNeill, It's Immaterial, Josef K, Mike Lindup, Stéphane Grappelli, The Happy Family, Tom Anderson, Tommy Smith, William Jackson and on Black's 2015 album, Blind Faith.

Malcolm "refurbished" Prefab Sprout's 2009 album, Let's Change the World with Music, and both mixed and produced their Crimson/Red album in 2013.

References

External links
 Video interview with Calum Malcolm at recordproduction.com
 Mini biography and Q&A section at linnrecords.com
 Discography at Discogs.com

Place of birth missing (living people)
Year of birth missing (living people)
Living people
Scottish record producers
Scottish audio engineers
Scottish keyboardists